The fifth series of the British television drama series Waterloo Road began broadcasting on 28 October 2009 and ended on 15 July 2010 on BBC One. The series follows the lives of the faculty and pupils of the Eponymous school, a failing inner-city comprehensive school. It consists of twenty episodes, divided into two half-series of ten episodes each and featured one of the biggest cast changes in the show's history.

Due to extensive news coverage on 11 May 2010, EastEnders and Holby City were instead shown on 12 May, and Waterloo Road was postponed for two weeks, due to the already scheduled Holby City episode on 19 May. The final two episodes of the series were delayed by four weeks, due to the 2010 FIFA World Cup, airing on 14 and 15 July respectively. The fifth series achieved an average of 5.03 million viewers in the ratings.

Plot
The show follows the lives of the teachers and the pupils at the eponymous school of Waterloo Road, a failing inner-city comprehensive, tackling a wide range of issues often seen as taboo such as murder, binge drinking, child sexual abuse, suicide pacts, schizophrenia, bankruptcy, workplace bullying, hemangioma, bribery, clinical depression, prescription drug abuse and false accusations of rape.

Cast and characters

Staff
 Eva Pope as Rachel Mason; Headteacher (19 episodes)
 William Ash as Christopher Mead; Deputy Headteacher and Science teacher (20 episodes)
 Angela Griffin as Kim Campbell; Head of Pastoral Care and Art teacher (20 episodes)
 Denise Welch as Steph Haydock; French teacher (20 episodes)
 Elizabeth Berrington as Ruby Fry; Head of Food Technology (20 episodes)
 Philip Martin Brown as Grantly Budgen; English teacher (20 episodes)
 Jason Done as Tom Clarkson; Head of English (18 episodes)
 Sarah-Jane Potts as Jo Lipsett; Head of Modern Foreign Languages (18 episodes)
 Elaine Symons as Rose Kelly; Canteen Assistant (14 episodes)
 Tom Chambers as Max Tyler; Executive Head (10 episodes)
 Vinette Robinson as Helen Hopewell; English teacher (8 episodes)
 Steven Waddington as Adam Fleet; Healthy Schools Co-ordinator (8 episodes)
 Kay Purcell as Candice Smilie; Senior Canteen Assistant (2 episodes)

Pupils
 Phoebe Dynevor as Siobhan Mailey (20 episodes)
 Ayesha Gwilt as Amy Porter (20 episodes)
 Darcy Isa as Lauren Andrews (20 episodes)
 Holly Kenny as Sambuca Kelly (20 episodes)
 Thomas Milner as Paul Langley (20 episodes)
 Lucy Dixon as Danielle Harker (19 episodes)
 Sophie McShera as Ros McCain (19 episodes)
 Tachia Newall as Bolton Smilie (19 episodes)
 William Rush as Josh Stevenson (19 episodes)
 Lauren Thomas as Aleesha Dillon (19 episodes)
 Zaraah Abrahams as Michaela White (17 episodes)
 Shannon Flynn as Emily James (17 episodes)
 Jessica Baglow as Karla Bentham (16 episodes)
 Dean Smith as Philip Ryan (16 episodes)
 Reece Douglas as Denzil Kelly (14 episodes)
 Jenna-Louise Coleman as Lindsay James (9 episodes)
 Jack McMullen as Finn Sharkey (9 episodes)
 Richie Jeeves as Luke Pendle (7 episodes)
 Rebecca Ryan as Vicki MacDonald (2 episodes)

Others

Recurring
 John McArdle as Oliver Mead; Chris' father and Steph's love interest (6 episodes)
 Fiona Allen as Georgia Stevenson; Josh's mother and Tom's ex-girlfriend (4 episodes)
 Louise Delamere as Marion James; Lindsay and Emily's mother (3 episodes)
 Georgia Mackenzie as Jennifer Headley; Head of the LEA and Max's wife (3 episodes)
 Sharlene Whyte as Alison Yates; Lindsay and Emily's social worker (3 episodes)
 Ralph Ineson as John Fry; Ruby's husband (2 episodes)
 Robyn Addison as Anna Reid; Chris' girlfriend (2 episodes)
 Paul Opacic as Ryan Sharkey; Finn's father (2 episodes)

Guest
 Mykola Allen as Michael Vale; Pupil (1 episode)
 Dean Andrews as Gary Vale; Bianka and Michael's father (1 episode)
 Jamie Birtwistle as Craig Moran; Pupil (1 episode)
 Josh Brown as Aiden Keen; Pupil (1 episode)
 Claire Hackett as Jacqui Keen; Aiden's mother (1 episode)
 Tom McKay as Mark Moran; Craig's brother (1 episode)
 Joanne Mitchell as Mrs. Turner; Cassie's mother (1 episode)
 Samantha Seager as Joely Vale; Bianka and Michael's mother (1 episode)
 Maisie-Jo Stahl as Bianka Vale; Pupil (1 episode)
 Hayley Tamaddon as Zoe; Photographer (1 episode)
 Charlotte Wakefield as Cassie Turner; Pupil (1 episode)

Episodes

DVD release
Three different box sets of the fifth series were released. The first ten episodes of the series were released on 14 June 2010, and the back ten episodes were released on 27 September 2010. All twenty episodes were later released together on 23 May 2011. They were released with a "12" British Board of Film Classification (BBFC) certificate (meaning it is unsuitable for viewing by those under the age of 12 years).

Footnotes

References

2009 British television seasons
2010 British television seasons
Waterloo Road (TV series)